The  Gabilan Lodge No. 372-Independent Order of Odd Fellows, also known as Odd Fellows Lodge, is a building built in 1914 in Gonzales, California, United States.  It was designed in Classical Revival style and served historically as a clubhouse.  It was listed on the National Register of Historic Places in 1986. It currently serves as chambers for the Gonzalez City Council.

References

Buildings and structures completed in 1914
Buildings and structures in Monterey County, California
Neoclassical architecture in California
Clubhouses on the National Register of Historic Places in California
Odd Fellows buildings in California
National Register of Historic Places in Monterey County, California